Decoupled is an Indian English-language comedy web series for Netflix written by Manu Joseph and directed by Hardik Mehta. The series stars R. Madhavan and Surveen Chawla in the lead roles.

Plot 
A misanthropic writer and his startup-founder wife juggle their impending divorce with the absurdities and annoyances of life in their affluent world.

Cast

 R. Madhavan as Arya 
 Surveen Chawla as Shruti 
 Arista Mehta as Rohini 
 Chetan Bhagat as himself
 Atul Kumar as Agni
 Bhavik Kelawala as Jamal Sarif
 Aseem Hattangadi as Mayank
 Mir Afsar Ali as Dr Basu
 Sonia Raathee as Masha
 Darren E. Scott as Jean Lee
 Dilnaz Irani as Reema
 Himanee Bhatia
 Akash Khurana as Surinder Sharma
 Apara Mehta as Madhu Sharma
 Mukesh Bhatt as Ganesh
 Nazneen Madan as Bhumika
 Salim Siddiqui as Salim Bhai
 Srestha Banerjee as Decoupling Party Manager (Goa)

Episodes

Release
The series opened to mixed review from critics, though the performances of the lead pair received praise. The show's creator, Manu Joseph, subsequently noted that 'liberal media' outlets targeted the show.

Within three days of release, the series became the leading Indian series on the platform of the week.

References

External links
 
 

2021 Indian television series debuts
Hindi-language Netflix original programming
Hindi-language web series
Indian drama web series
Indian comedy television series
Indian drama television series
Indian comedy web series